Excavations in Cronberry, East Ayrshire, Scotland by Headland Archaeology revealed a medieval turf building and a nearby enclosure of unknown date. The turf structure was sub-rectangular and contained a hearth surrounded by some paving. Pottery dating to no later than the 16th century was recovered from the interior. The enclosure was also constructed of turf.

The full plan of the turf building was exposed during excavation. Due to the construction materials and nature of the building it had been greatly affected by soil processes from the time it went out of use to the present. The walls appeared to have been made from a mixture of turf and soil of local origin. Preservation was found to vary with the south end showing the best. Extensive slumping had occurred, and this combined with subsequent decay, made excavation difficult. The presence of charcoal and charred cereal grains within the walls suggested that material from earlier occupation may have been incorporated and the remains may have represented more than one structural phase.

On the interior of the building the level of the floor was indicated by the hearth and some slabs. Elsewhere, the floor was likely to have been of beaten earth, which is no longer recognisable due to the mixing of soil. There was no evidence for internal partitions within the building

See also
 Vernacular architecture
 Earth shelter
 Cob (material)

References
 Baker, L. (2000) 'Gasswater Open cast Coal Scheme, Cronberry', Discovery and Excavation in Scotland, p. 23.
 

Archaeological sites in East Ayrshire